Llanelli Wanderers Rugby Football Club is a rugby union team from the town of Llanelli, South Wales. They are members of the Welsh Rugby Union and is a feeder club for the Llanelli Scarlets.

History
In the 1946-47 a group of ex-servicemen set up a new Llanelli team the YMCA RFC. In 1951 the Llanelli Wanderers RFC was formed, and the headquarters were the old Prince of Wales Inn. The club's motto "Cyfeillach trwy Grwydro" (Friendship Through Wandering) has been practiced to the full with the club having had many different headquarters before moving to the present one in 2003. Similarly the club has needed to use many corporation grounds, as well as sharing the facilities of their neighbours Llanelli RFC.

Club Badge
The Llanelli Wanderers badge is a cockle shell in the team colours holding the clubs initials. Underneath is the club motto "Cyfeillach trwy Grwydro" (Friendship Through Wandering). The motto, "Friendship through wandering," reflects Llanelli’s position as the first club to tour in Europe.

Notable Past Players
Aled Williams (Club Chairman)
Steffan Hughes (Scarlets)
Clive Rees (London Welsh, Wales and British Lions)

References

External links
 Llanelli Wanderers RFC Official club site.

Sport in Llanelli
Welsh rugby union teams